Magnolia fistulosa is a species of plant in the family Magnoliaceae. It is endemic to China.

References

fistulosa
Endemic flora of China
Endangered flora of Asia
Taxonomy articles created by Polbot